Korean Peninsula is a 2012 South Korean television series starring Hwang Jung-min and Kim Jung-eun. It aired on newly launched  cable channel TV Chosun from February 6 to April 3, 2012 on Mondays and Tuesdays at 20:50 for 18 episodes.

Plot
Seo Myung-joon is a South Korean scientist who falls in love with North Korean scientist Im Jin-jae while developing an alternative energy source together. But when Myung-joon unexpectedly becomes the president of a reunified Korea, political tensions rise as a massive struggle for limited natural resources continues to divide the country.

Cast
Hwang Jung-min ... Seo Myung-joon 
Kim Jung-eun ... Im Jin-jae
Jo Sung-ha ... Park Do-myung, chief presidential secretary
Kwak Hee-sung ... Min Dong-ki
Jo Yi-jin ... Park Hye-jung
Ji Hoo ... Kang Dong-won 
Sung Byung-sook ... Jung Hyun-sook
Kang Soo-min ...Baek Do-jin
Jung Jae-hun ... Seo Jang-yeob
Kim Jung-kyeon ...   Hong Hak-soo
Jung Wook ... Shin Chang-seok
Lee Won-suk ... Kim Jung-sik
Lee Soon-jae ... Kang Dae-hyun
Ahn Nam-hee ... Na Yeon-sung
Choi Il-hwa .... Park Jung-pyo
Yeon Ye-hee ... Song Seung-joo
Lee Hae-young  ... Han Young-hoon
Choi Dae-hoon ... Chae Dong-hoon
Jung Dong-hwan ... Oh Chang-il
Yoon Joo-sang ... Seok Joo-hwan
Go In-beom ... Chief of staff
Jung Dong-gyu ... Kim Won-ho
Park Geun-soo ... Jung Cheol
Jung Sung-Mo ... Jo Gook-cheol
Kim Ji-sook ... Han Kyung-ok
Kim Ha-kyun ...Kim Deuk-soo
Kim Su-hyeon ... Lee Young-choon
Jung Jin ... Jung Yong-gi
Seo Tae-hwa ... Kim Tae-sung
Park Chan-hwan ... Lim Cheol-woo
Heo Jung-gyu ... Dong Jung-geun
Lee Hee-seok ... Kang Hee-joong
Hwang Chan-woo ... Kim Yong-soo
Heo Jae-ho ...   Jeon Joong-won
Yang Hee-yoon ... Lee Sung-ho
Jang Nam-yeol ... Kim Ho-taek
Lee Cheol-min ... Jo Kap-seok
Choi Jae-hwan ... Park Gwang-tae
Ji Woo-seok ... Cha Seung-jae
Kim Jae-rok ... Koo Yeon-cheol

Reception
The action/political thriller premiered with a promising rating of 1.649%, but succeeding episodes dropped to around 0.8%. This led to TV Chosun cutting down the number of episodes from the planned 24 to 18.

International broadcast
In Thailand, the drama aired dubbed into Thai under the title วายร้าย สองคาบสมุทร (wai-rai song khab-samuth; literally: Scoundrel of Two Peninsulas) on the Zaa Network (currently Mono Plus) beginning early 2014.

References

External links
 Korean Peninsula official TV Chosun website 
 

2012 South Korean television series debuts
2012 South Korean television series endings
Korean-language television shows
TV Chosun television dramas
South Korean political television series
South Korean action television series
Television series by RaemongRaein